Posof District is a district of Ardahan Province of Turkey. Its seat is the town Posof. Its area is 583 km2, and its population is 6,448 (2021). It has a border crossing with neighboring Georgia at Türkgözü.

Composition
There is one municipality in Posof District:
 Posof

There are 48 villages in Posof District (former names also given):

 Akballı (Obol)
 Alabalık (Sayho)
 Alköy (Al)
 Arılı (Zedezünde)
 Armutveren (Papola)
 Asmakonak (Sanhuliye)
 Aşıküzeyir (Hevat)
 Aşıkzülali (Suskap)
 Balgöze (Çıldıret)
 Baykent (Vahla)
 Binbaşıeminbey (Cilvana)
 Çakırkoç (Mere)
 Çambeli (Sagre)
 Çamyazı (Ohtel)
 Çayırçimen (Lamiyan)
 Demirdöver (Varzna)
 Derindere
 Erim
 Gönülaçan (Şuvaskal)
 Gümüşkavak (Zendar)
 Günbatan (Banarhev)
 Günlüce (Caborya)
 Gürarmut (Kolishal)
 İncedere (Cuvantel)
 Kaleönü (Agara)
 Kalkankaya (Pedoban)
 Kayınlı (Şurğavul)
 Kırköy (Kırdamala)
 Kolköy (Kol)
 Kopuzlu (Çorçovan)
 Kumlukoz (Gume)
 Kurşunçavuş (Sece)
 Özbaşı (Gıniye)
 Sarıçiçek (Hertus)
 Sarıdarı (Tepesünde)
 Savaşır (Cancak)
 Söğütlükaya (Hunemis)
 Süngülü (Arile)
 Sütoluk (Satkabel)
 Taşkıran (Görgüsüben)
 Türkgözü (Badele)
 Uğurca (Yukarı Cacun)
 Uluçam (Varhana)
 Yaylaaltı (Satlel)
 Yeniköy
 Yolağzı (Sinsetip)
 Yurtbaşı (Sakabol)
 Yurtbekler (Caksuyu)

References

Districts of Ardahan Province